Collection is an album by American guitarist Lee Ritenour released in 1991, recorded for the GRP label. Collection contains a retrospective of Ritenour's 1979-1991 work. The album reached #7 on Billboard's Contemporary Jazz chart.

Track listing

Personnel
Lee Ritenour - Guitar
Dave Grusin - Keyboards
Alan Broadbent - Piano
Ernie Watts - Saxophone
Harvey Mason - Drums
Carlos Vega - Drums
Omar Hakim - Drums
Jimmy Haslip - Bass
Jimmy Johnson - Bass
Marcus Miller - Bass
John Pattitucci - Bass
Abraham Laboriel - Bass
Eric Tagg - Vocals
Alex Acuña - Percussion
Mitch Holder - Guitar

Track information and credits adapted the album's liner notes.

Charts

References

External links
- Collection at Discogs
Lee Ritenour's Official Site

1991 albums
GRP Records albums
Lee Ritenour albums